Jamel Thomas (born July 19, 1976) is an American former professional basketball player who played in the National Basketball Association (NBA). He was a  guard/forward.

Thomas was born in Brooklyn, New York. He played collegiately for Providence College. Upon his 1999 graduation, he appeared in the National Basketball Association (NBA) during the 1999–2000 (three games for the Boston Celtics and four – for the Golden State Warriors) and 2000–01 (five games with the New Jersey Nets) seasons, holding career averages of 8.5 minutes, 2.6 points and 1.8 rebounds per game. He was also signed for a brief period by the Cleveland Cavaliers and Portland Trail Blazers (1999–2000) and Utah Jazz (2000–01), but never played for those teams in an NBA game.

He played two seasons in the Continental Basketball Association (CBA) and was selected as the CBA Rookie of the Year in 2000. After a stint in the American Basketball Association (ABA) and his New Jersey spell, Thomas moved overseas, mostly playing for teams in Turkey and Italy. In 2006–07 he played for Beşiktaş and Angelico Biella.

Thomas is the older half-brother of Sebastian Telfair who also played in the NBA. Thomas wrote a book about his life titled The Beautiful Struggle, which was released by Xlibris in late September 2008. In the book, Thomas comments on his half-brother, as well as on cousin Stephon Marbury.

References

External links

1973 births
Living people
Abraham Lincoln High School (Brooklyn) alumni
African-American basketball players
American expatriate basketball people in Greece
American expatriate basketball people in Italy
American expatriate basketball people in Turkey
American men's basketball players
Apollon Patras B.C. players
Basket Napoli players
Beşiktaş men's basketball players
Basketball players from New York City
Boston Celtics players
Golden State Warriors players
Greek Basket League players
Mens Sana Basket players
New Jersey Nets players
Olympia Larissa B.C. players
Pallacanestro Biella players
Panellinios B.C. players
Providence Friars men's basketball players
Shooting guards
Small forwards
Sportspeople from Brooklyn
Teramo Basket players
Undrafted National Basketball Association players
21st-century African-American sportspeople
20th-century African-American sportspeople